Nieuwendijk can refer to the places:
 Nieuwendijk in North Brabant.
 Nieuwendijk (South Holland)
 Nieuwendijk, Amsterdam 

Notable people with the surname Nieuwendijk:
 Pepijn van den Nieuwendijk (born 1970), Dutch painter and ceramist
Dirk Nieuwendijk, Engineer

See also 
 Joe Nieuwendyk, Canadian ice hockey player